Oren Claude Frood (February 10, 1889 – January 14, 1943) was a Canadian professional ice hockey left winger. Frood played as a professional for the Haileybury Hockey Club in the TPHL and the Berlin Dutchmen in the OPHL.

Playing career
Oren Frood began his hockey career with the Pembroke Hockey Club of the Upper Ottawa Valley Hockey League where he played from 1906 to 1908. In 1909 he played with the Haileybury Hockey Club in the Timiskaming Professional Hockey League.

For the 1910 season Frood joined the Berlin Dutchmen of the Ontario Professional Hockey League. Berlin Dutchmen won the league championship in 1910 and in March 1910 the club challenged the Montreal Wanderers, champions of the NHA, for the Stanley Cup. Frood scored a goal in the game but the Montreal club won 7 to 3.

From 1913 to 1916 Frood played with the Medicine Hat Scoundrels of the SAHA. In 1916 he enlisted with the Canadian Army and served in the First World War.

References

Bibliography 
 

1889 births
1943 deaths
Haileybury Comets players
Canadian military personnel of World War I
Canadian ice hockey forwards
Ice hockey people from Ontario